Bannock  is a census-designated place in northwestern Richland Township, Belmont County, Ohio, United States, along Wheeling Creek. As of the 2010 census it had a population of 211. It has a post office with the ZIP code 43972. It lies along State Route 331.

Bannock is part of the Wheeling, WV-OH Metropolitan Statistical Area.

Bannock was originally called Bruce, after Bruce Caldwell, the son of the original owner of the town site.  A post office called Bannock has been in operation since 1880. Besides the post office, Bannock had a country store.

References

Census-designated places in Belmont County, Ohio
1880 establishments in Ohio
Populated places established in 1880